Louis VI of Hesse-Darmstadt (25 January 1630 – 24 April 1678) was Landgrave of Hesse-Darmstadt from 1661 to 1678.

He was the eldest of three sons of the Landgrave George II of Hesse-Darmstadt and Sophia Eleonore of Saxony.

Marriage and children 

Louis VI was married twice.

1. On 24 November 1650 he married his maternal cousin Maria Elisabeth of Schleswig-Holstein-Gottorp (1634–1665), daughter of Frederick III, Duke of Holstein-Gottorp.  They had eight children:

 Magdalene Sybille (1652–1712) a renowned composer of baroque churchsongs; she married Duke William Louis of Württemberg.
 Sophie Eleonore (born and died 1653).
 George (1654–1655).
 Marie Elisabeth (1656–1715) married in 1676 Duke Henry of Saxe-Römhild.
 Auguste Magdalene (1657–1674).
 Louis (1658–1678), his successor (Louis VII).
 Frederick (1659–1676)
 Sophie Marie (1661–1712) married in 1681 Duke Christian of Saxe-Eisenberg (1653–1707).

2. On 5 December 1666 he married Elisabeth Dorothea of Saxe-Gotha-Altenburg (1640–1709), daughter of Ernest I, Duke of Saxe-Gotha. They also had eight children.

 Ernst Louis (1667–1739), successor of his half-brother Louis VII who ruled for only 4 months
 Georg (1669–1705), renowned Field Marshal, killed in Barcelona
 Sophie Louise (1670–1758), married Prince Albrecht Ernst II von Oettingen-Oettingen (1669–1731)
 Philip (1671–1736), Imperial Field Marshal and governor of Mantua, married in 1693 Princess Marie Therese of Croy (1673–1714); Princess Enrichetta d'Este was their daughter-in-law
 Johann (1672–1673)
 Heinrich (1674–1741)
 Elisabeth Dorothea (1676–1721), married Frederick III Jakob of Hessen-Homburg (1673–1746)
 Friedrich (1677–1708), killed in battle

Ancestors 

|-

1630 births
1678 deaths
House of Hesse-Darmstadt
Landgraves of Hesse-Darmstadt